Saqr Abu Fakhr is an Arab writer living in Lebanon.  He is a researcher and author specialized in Arab Affairs, with special focus on Palestinian Affairs. Started writing in 1973, Abu Fakher's works have been published in newspapers and journals such as the As-Safir, Arab Studies and The Palestinian Affairs.

Saqr Abu Fakhr is currently a Researcher and Editor at the Arab Center for Research and Policy Studies.

Editorial and Writing Career 
Abu Fakhr has held a variety of editorial and research positions; he was appointed as the Editorial Secretary for the "Palestine Supplement" in Assafir, a leading Arabic daily newspaper. Since 1981, he was the editor or the assistant managing editor for a number of journals and research institutes, namely the PLO Planning Center  and the Institute for Palestine Studies.  He was also the editor of Majallat Al-Dirasat Al-Filastiniyya (مجلة الدراسات الفلسطينية), the Arabic-language journal of the Institute for Palestine Studies (مؤسسة الدراسات الفلسطينية).

Writing 
Abu Fakhr has written extensively about Palestinian history, culture, and the situation of refugees in Lebanon. His writings have been translated into various languages (such as Turkish, Kurdish, Persian, French and English). He is a member of a number of professional associations (such as the General Union of Palestinian Writers and Journalists, the Information Committee in the International Council for the Palestinians in the Diaspora - Geneva) and other advocacy societies (such the Arab National Congress and the Right of return). Abu Fakhr also became the editor of a collection of unpublished short stories by the Palestinian writer Samira Azzam upon discovering them and made them available to the public.

Abu Fakhr is the author of the article "Seven Prejudices about the Jews" published in Al-Hayat newspaper (November 12, 13, 14 1997). He criticized ignorance, narrow-mindedness, and denial prevalent in the Arab world, and described Arab thought regarding the Jews and the history of the Arab–Israeli conflict as full of misconceptions and myths.

The book examined and refuted seven common subjects of Arab myths about Israel:

 That Judaism is not a monotheistic religion.
 That the blood libel and the matzah of Zion stories are true.
 That the Israeli flag represents the goal of the borders of Israel be from the Nile to the Euphrates
 That The Protocols of the Elders of Zion is true.
 That there is a Zionist Jewish conspiracy and that Jews wield hidden power
 That there is a unique Jewish ingenuity.
 That there is an all-powerful Zionist "Jewish lobby" in the United States.

References

Mass media about the Arab–Israeli conflict
Lebanese journalists
Living people
Year of birth missing (living people)